Beneath the Sky of Mexico (Spanish: Bajo el cielo de México) is a 1937 Mexican dramedy  film. It was directed by Fernando de Fuentes and starred David Silva.

References

External links
 

1937 films
1930s Spanish-language films
Films directed by Fernando de Fuentes
Mexican black-and-white films
Mexican comedy-drama films
1937 comedy-drama films
1930s Mexican films